Woolly hair nevus (alternatively spelled "Wooly hair nevus") is a congenital condition in which hair in a circumscribed area of the scalp is kinked or woolly.

See also 
 Woolly hair
 Naxos syndrome
 Striate palmoplantar keratoderma, woolly hair, and left ventricular dilated cardiomyopathy
 List of cutaneous conditions

References

External links 

Epidermal nevi, neoplasms, and cysts
Conditions of the skin appendages